Caroline Norrby (née Kull; born 6 August 1979) is a Swedish television host.

Born in Stockholm, Norrby began her career in 2010 and is best known for currently hosting Såld på hus on TV4. Prior to hosting Såld på hus, she presented the children's program Lattjo Lajban.

References

1979 births
Living people
Entertainers from Stockholm
Swedish television hosts
Swedish women television presenters